All Saints church is a Church of England church in Shenley Road, Borehamwood. It is in the parish of Elstree and Borehamwood. The church is built in the Jacobean style and dates from 1909.

References

External links 

Borehamwood
1909 establishments in England
Borehamwood